Ibban  is a village in Kapurthala district of Punjab State, India. The village is administrated by a Sarpanch, who is an elected representative

Demography 
According to the report published by Census India in 2011, Ibban has total number of 325 houses and population of 1,516 of which include 776 males and 740 females. Literacy rate of Ibban is 80.51%, higher than state average of 75.84%.  The population of children under the age of 6 years is 141 which is 9.30% of total population of Ibban, and child sex ratio is approximately  855, higher than state average of 846.

Air travel connectivity 
The closest airport to the village is Sri Guru Ram Dass Jee International Airport.

Villages in Kapurthala

References

External links
  Villages in Kapurthala
 Kapurthala Villages List

Villages in Kapurthala district